Shangma Subdistrict is a subdistrict in Chengyang District, Qingdao, Shandong province, China. , it has 26 residential communities under its administration.

See also 
 List of township-level divisions of Shandong

References 

Township-level divisions of Shandong
Geography of Qingdao
Subdistricts of the People's Republic of China